Zálesie is a village and municipality in Kežmarok District in the Prešov Region of north Slovakia.

History
In historical records, the village was first mentioned in 1520.

Geography
It has a population of about 105.

External links
http://www.statistics.sk/mosmis/eng/run.html

Villages and municipalities in Kežmarok District